Michael Francis Eden, 7th Baron Henley and 5th Baron Northington (13 August 1914 – 20 December 1977), was a British peer active in Liberal Party politics.

Eden succeeded as Baron Henley and Baron Northington in 1962.  He served as President of the Liberal Party from 1966 to 1967, then as Chairman from 1968 to 1969. He served as deputy whip of the party in the House of Lords. In 1973, he was appointed Chairman of the Council for the Protection of Rural England. Outside politics, he bought and restored Scaleby Castle.

References

1914 births
1977 deaths
Barons in the Peerage of Ireland
Northington, Michael Eden, 5th Baron
Michael Eden
Chairs of the Liberal Party (UK)
Presidents of the Liberal Party (UK)
Liberal Party (UK) hereditary peers
Barons Henley